Flat Fork is an unincorporated community within Magoffin County, Kentucky, United States.

A post office was established in the community in 1934 and named for a fork in the nearby Little Paint Creek.

References

Unincorporated communities in Magoffin County, Kentucky
Unincorporated communities in Kentucky